Leptochiton is a genus of South American plants in the Amaryllis family.

There are 2 known species, native to Ecuador and Peru:
Leptochiton helianthus (Ravenna) Gereau & Meerow - Peru (Cajamarca)
Leptochiton quitoensis (Herb.) Sealy - Ecuador (Guayas, Loja), Peru

References

Amaryllidaceae genera
Amaryllidoideae